Top Gear Italia is an Italian motoring show, which was first broadcast on 22 March 2016 on Sky Uno. It is an international version of the British BBC Two motoring show, Top Gear. This version of the show is presented by Davide Valsecchi, Guido Meda and Joe Bastianich. It also features the Italian version of "The Stig".

History
It was reported by The Guardian on 27 July 2015 that Sky Italy had purchased the right to the format and that Guido Meda (a presenter for the Italian version of Sky Sports and commentator of the Moto GP), Joe Bastianich (previously a judge on MasterChef Italia) and a then unconfirmed third host would be the presenters of the localised version. Later in the year it was revealed that the third presenter would be Davide Valsecchi, known for motorsport in Italy, through his personal Twitter account. Sky released an official statement on 16 February 2016 revealing that filming would take place between 18 February and 1 March of that year with first episode airing on 22 March, it also revealed that a test track had been set up at the Biella-Cerrione Airport.

Challenges
In one challenge, the contestants built a popemobile for 5000 Euros.

Episodes

References

External links

2016 Italian television series debuts
2016 Italian television series endings
Italian television series
Italian documentary television series
Italian reality television series
2000s Italian television series
Italian television series based on British television series
Sky Uno original programming